Kennedy Range National Park is a national park in Gascoyne region of Western Australia,  approximately  north of Perth and about  east of Carnarvon.

The Range formed a natural border for two Aboriginal peoples, the Maia and the Malgaru. Natural springs located on the edge of the ranges would have provided game to hunt and outcrops of chert would have provided stone for tools. Over 100 sites provide evidence that the Indigenous Australians inhabited the area for over 20,000 years prior to European settlement.

The first European to explore the area was Francis Thomas Gregory, whose expedition reached the range in 1858. Gregory named the range after the Governor of Western Australia at the time, Arthur Edward Kennedy.
He also named the nearby Lyons River in the same expedition before continuing to Mount Augustus. Pastoralists arrived in the area shortly afterwards with Charles Brockman setting up Boolathana Station in 1877, and the region experienced success in wool production until the 1930s when the overgrazing, drought and the great depression caused most businesses to fail.

The valleys and plains of the range had been severely degraded but the range top was only slightly damaged as a result of pastoral activity. The area has been explored for minerals but has not been mined.

The park was officially gazetted in 1993 and contains some facilities for visitors. A bush toilet and camp-sites are located at Temple Gorge, but it is planned to relocate this camp ground. There are a number of walk trails within the park but no water is available. Entry to the park is free but camp-site fees apply.

A popular time to visit the park is following heavy rains when wildflowers emerge. Over 80 species of wildflower are known to inhabit the park, including mulla mulla, hakeas, Eremophilas, Calytrix, Verticordia and various everlasting daisies.

A species of lizard Lerista kennedyensis, commonly called the "Kennedy Range broad-blazed slider", is named after the Kennedy Range.

See also

 Protected areas of Western Australia

References 

National parks of Western Australia
Protected areas established in 1993
Shire of Upper Gascoyne
Shire of Carnarvon